Parliamentary elections were held in Bulgaria in January and February 1880. Low voter turnout in some constituencies led to the results being invalidated and the elections re-run. Unlike in former elections, the government did not attempt to influence the result, resulting in the opposition Liberal Party retaining their majority in the National Assembly. Of the 162 seats, the Liberal Party won 103 and the Conservative Party won 50. When the newly elected Assembly convened, Liberal Party member Petko Karavelov was elected Chairperson.

Following the election the government resigned, but incumbent Prime Minister Kliment Turnovski was asked to form another government. Ultimately Dragan Tsankov formed a government and became Prime Minister on 8 April.

Results

References

Bulgaria
1880 in Bulgaria
Parliamentary elections in Bulgaria
January 1880 events
February 1880 events